James Lloyd "Jay" McClelland, FBA (born December 1, 1948) is the Lucie Stern Professor at Stanford University, where he was formerly the chair of the Psychology Department.  He is best known for his work on statistical learning and Parallel Distributed Processing, applying connectionist models (or neural networks) to explain cognitive phenomena such as spoken word recognition and visual word recognition. McClelland is to a large extent responsible for the large increase in scientific interest in connectionism in the 1980s.

Early life and education 
McClelland was born on December 1, 1948 to Walter Moore and Frances (Shaffer) McClelland. He received a B.A. in Psychology from Columbia University in 1970, and a Ph.D. in Cognitive Psychology from the University of Pennsylvania in 1975. He married Heidi Marsha Feldman on May 6, 1978, and has two daughters.

Career 

In 1986 McClelland published Parallel Distributed Processing: Explorations in the Microstructure of Cognition with David Rumelhart, which some still regard as a bible for cognitive scientists. His present work focuses on learning, memory processes, and psycholinguistics, still within the framework of connectionist models.  He is a former chair of the Rumelhart Prize committee, having collaborated with Rumelhart for many years, and himself received the award in 2010 at the Cognitive Science Society Annual Conference in Portland, Oregon.

McClelland and David Rumelhart are known for their debate with Steven Pinker and Alan Prince regarding the necessity of a language-specific learning module.

In fall 2006 McClelland moved to Stanford University from Carnegie Mellon University, where he was a professor of psychology and Cognitive Neuroscience. He also holds a part-time appointment as Consulting Professor at the Neuroscience and Aphasia Research Unit (NARU) within the School of Psychological Sciences, University of Manchester.

Awards 
Mind & Brain Prize
 University of Louisville Grawemeyer Award in psychology, 2002
 William W. Cumming prize from Columbia University, 1970
 Research Scientist Career Development Award from the National Institute of Mental Health, 1981—86, 1987—97
 Fellow, National Science Foundation, 1970—73
 Rumelhart Prize, 2010
C.L. de Carvalho-Heineken Prize, 2014

In July 2017, McClelland was elected a Corresponding Fellow of the British Academy (FBA), the United Kingdom's national academy for the humanities and social sciences.

See also
Artificial neural networks
Cognitive science
Connectionism
Emergence
TRACE model of speech perception

References

External links
 Personal website
 Staff website at University of Manchester

Computational psychologists
American cognitive neuroscientists
Speech perception researchers
Rumelhart Prize laureates
Stanford University Department of Psychology faculty
Carnegie Mellon University faculty
Fellows of the Society of Experimental Psychologists
Members of the United States National Academy of Sciences
Fellows of the American Association for the Advancement of Science
1948 births
Living people
Psycholinguists
Winners of the Heineken Prize
Fellows of the Cognitive Science Society
Corresponding Fellows of the British Academy